The Monrad cabinet was the government of Denmark from 31 December 1863 to 11 July 1864, and was in power in the beginning of the Second Schleswig War.

List of ministers and portfolios
The cabinet consisted of these ministers:

References

1863 establishments in Denmark
1864 disestablishments
Monrad